Divilly is an Irish surname. Notable people with the surname include:

 John Divilly, Gaelic footballer
 Martin Divilly (died 1979), Mayor of Galway, Ireland

Surnames of Irish origin